The Blue Earth River is a tributary of the Minnesota River,  long, in southern Minnesota in the United States. Two of its headwaters tributaries, the Middle Branch Blue Earth River and the West Branch Blue Earth River, also flow for short distances in northern Iowa. By volume, it is the Minnesota River's largest tributary, accounting for 46% of the Minnesota's flow at the rivers' confluence in Mankato. Ninety percent of the river's watershed is in Minnesota. It is a Minnesota Department of Natural Resources designated Water Trail.

History
The river was named for former deposits of bluish-green clay, no longer visible, along the banks of the river. The stream was called Makato Osa Watapa by the Dakota Indians, meaning "the river where blue earth is gathered." The French explorer Pierre-Charles Le Sueur established Fort L'Huillier near the river's mouth in 1700 for the purpose of mining the clay, either in the mistaken belief that the clay contained copper, or as a ruse to secure funding from his patrons for his fur trading activities. The fort was abandoned the following year after an attack by the Fox tribe. In the 19th century, the geographer Joseph Nicollet found cavities from which the clay had been dug by Native Americans in the region, who used it as body paint; he found no evidence of Le Sueur's mines, nor of the fort.

Geography
Both headwaters tributaries have been channelized for much of their courses.

From their confluence the Blue Earth River flows northwardly in a winding course through eastern Faribault County into Blue Earth County, past the cities of Blue Earth, Winnebago, and Vernon Center, to Mankato, where it enters the Minnesota River from the south. The hydroelectric facility was later decommissioned but reactivated in 1984.

The two rivers drain 31% and 24% of the Blue Earth's watershed, respectively.

The Blue Earth River flows in most of its course through till plains and the plain of a former glacial lake. The drain of the glacial lake, Union Slough, drains in two directions, south into the East Fork of the Des Moines River and north, as Union Slough, into the West Branch of the Blue Earth River. The lower (northern) part of the river's watershed was historically covered by the Big Woods, a tract of hardwoods that has since been largely converted to agricultural use; segments of the woodland extended southward along the riparian corridors of the Blue Earth River and its tributaries.  In its lower course below Rapidan Dam, the river flows through a wooded gorge in the valley of the Minnesota River; this section is a popular canoeing route.

According to the Minnesota Pollution Control Agency, approximately 84% of the Blue Earth River's watershed is used for agricultural cultivation, primarily that of corn and soybeans. The river is one of the most polluted in Minnesota, with elevated levels of sediment, bacteria, nitrates, phosphorus, mercury, PCBs, and pesticides, contributed in part by runoff in the watershed.  Fecal coliforms, contributed by manure fertilizers, livestock waste, substandard septic tanks and outdated sewer systems, are often present in the river at levels considered by the state government to be unsafe for swimming.

Flow rate

The annual mean flow of the river at the gauge between 1909 and 2005 was 1,076 cubic feet per second (30 m³/s). The highest recorded flow during the period was 43,100 ft³/s (1,220 m³/s) on April 9, 1965. The lowest recorded flow was 6.9 ft³/s (0.2 m³/s) on October 12, 1955.

See also
List of rivers of Minnesota
List of rivers of Iowa

References

Rivers of Iowa
Rivers of Minnesota
Tributaries of the Minnesota River
Rivers of Blue Earth County, Minnesota
Rivers of Faribault County, Minnesota
Rivers of Kossuth County, Iowa
Rivers of Winnebago County, Iowa
Water trails